Enrico Barbin (born 4 March 1990) is an Italian racing cyclist, who last rode for UCI Professional Continental team . He rode in the Giro d'Italia in 2014, 2015 and 2017.

Major results

2010
 3rd Memorial Rino Fiori
 10th Trofeo Città di Brescia
2011
 1st Stage 1 Giro del Veneto
 4th Giro del Belvedere
 6th Coppa della Pace
 10th Gran Premio di Poggiana
2012
 1st Gran Premio della Liberazione
 1st Trofeo Città di San Vendemiano
 1st Trofeo Alcide Degasperi
 1st Stage 1 Toscana-Terra di Ciclismo
 1st Stage 6 Girobio
 2nd Giro del Belvedere
 3rd Coppa della Pace
 3rd Piccolo Giro di Lombardia
 7th Gran Premio Industria e Commercio Artigianato Carnaghese
 7th Trofeo Gianfranco Bianchin
 8th Ruota d'Oro
 10th Trofeo Edil C
2013
 4th Roma Maxima
 8th Overall Tour of Slovenia
2014
 9th Gran Premio della Costa Etruschi
 10th Overall Tour of Turkey
2015
 7th Overall Tour of Turkey
 7th Memorial Marco Pantani
2016
 7th Memorial Marco Pantani
2017
 1st Stage 6 Tour de Langkawi
 7th Coppa Ugo Agostoni
2018
 5th Overall International Tour of Rhodes
 Giro d'Italia
Held  after Stages 2–5

Grand Tour general classification results timeline

References

External links

1990 births
Living people
Italian male cyclists
People from Treviglio
Cyclists from the Province of Bergamo